Toxochitona gerda, the Gerda's buff, is a butterfly in the family Lycaenidae. It is found in Nigeria (the Cross River loop), Cameroon, the Republic of the Congo, the Democratic Republic of the Congo (Kwilu), Uganda, western Kenya and western Tanzania. The habitat consists of forests.

References

Butterflies described in 1890
Poritiinae
Taxa named by William Forsell Kirby
Butterflies of Africa